Curonian may refer to:
 Curonian language
 Curonians, or Kurs, a Baltic tribe in present-day western Latvia and Lithuania
 from Curonia, Latin for Courland

See also 
 Curonian Lagoon
 Curonian Spit / Courish Spit

Language and nationality disambiguation pages